Shareef Dancer (1980–1999) was an American-bred, British-trained Thoroughbred racehorse.

Background
Shareef Dancer was sired by Northern Dancer out of the mare Sweet Alliance by Sir Ivor. He was bought by Maktoum bin Rashid Al Maktoum for $3.3 million at Keeneland Sales in 1981, the second-highest selling yearling that year, behind only Ballydoyle. Shareef Dancer was trained by Michael Stoute at Newmarket, Suffolk.

Racing career
The colt started five times, finishing his racing career 3-1-0 with earnings of £144,331. He won the Group I Irish Derby Stakes at the Curragh and the Group II King Edward VII Stakes.

Stud record
In 1983 Shareef Dancer sold for US$40m (£24m), a record price for a stallion prospect. His offspring included Possessive Dancer, Rock Hopper (Hardwicke Stakes), Glory of Dancer (Dante Stakes) Spartan Shareef (September Stakes) Mudahim (Cleeve Hurdle, Racing Post Chase) and Shaima (Long Island Handicap). He was also the damsire of Dubai Millennium. His final stud fee in 1999 was £3,500.

Pedigree

References

1980 racehorse births
1999 racehorse deaths
Racehorses bred in Maryland
Racehorses trained in the United Kingdom
Irish Classic Race winners
Thoroughbred family 4-r